Ladder of Tyre (Aramaic: Sûlama de Ṣôr),, also known as the Ladder of the Tyrians and the Promontory of Tyre, is a geographical feature mentioned in Greek and Hebrew sources, distinguished by a littoral mountainous range, the highest point of which is distant  north of Acre in northern Israel. The range stretches beyond Tyre in southern Lebanon. Along its Mediterranean coastline, the Ladder of Tyre skirts an area of about five miles wide at its greatest width, and is distinguished by capes that jut westward into the sea from the ridge which runs parallel to the general line of the coast. The Ladder of Tyre is mentioned in the Babylonian Talmud, in the Jerusalem Talmud, in the First Book of Maccabees (11:59), and in the writings of Josephus. 

According to the Babylonian Talmud, the waters of the region were formerly known for the marine mollusk (Murex), harvested for its blue-dye. The 1st-century historian Josephus puts 100 stadia (c. 11½ mi.; 18½ km.) from the north of Acre to the highest point (massif) in the promontory known as the Ladder of Tyre. This high place is now associated with Rosh HaNikra grottoes (Scala Tyriorum), and which marked the southern pass into Phoenicia proper, and formed the boundary between that country and Palestine. According to Josephus, a place nearby was also known for its fine, crystalline sand used in glass making.

According to historical geographer Joseph Schwarz, where the Mount Amana range terminates at the rock cliffs of Râs en-Nakûrah, "on this rock is a narrow ascent, shaped somewhat like steps, by which its summit can be reached; hence it is called in the Talmud the Ladder of Tyre." Conder was of the same opinion, that the promontory of Nakûrah was the same as the ancient Ladder of Tyre. Historical geographer, Isaac Goldhor, places the Ladder of Tyre at a distance of 3 biblical miles from Achziv.

Gallery

References

Bibliography

 

 

 (reprinted A. Hart: Philadelphia 1850)

External links
 Ladder of Tyre, Library of Congress
Survey of Western Palestine, Map 3:  IAA, Wikimedia commons  

Landforms of the Middle East
Landforms of Israel
Landforms of Lebanon
Geology of Lebanon
Geology of Israel
Physiographic provinces
Classical sites in Israel
Tyre District
Geography of Lebanon
Geography of Israel